James H. German (November 6, 1917 – August 8, 1945) was an American football quarterback in the National Football League for the Washington Redskins and the Chicago Cardinals.  He played college football at Centre College and was drafted in the eleventh round of the 1939 NFL Draft.

1917 births
1945 deaths
American football quarterbacks
Chicago Cardinals players
Players of American football from Louisville, Kentucky
Washington Redskins players
Wilmington Clippers players